Boggs Field  is a privately owned, public use airport located one nautical mile (2 km) north of the central business district of Spencer, in Roane County, West Virginia, United States.

Although most U.S. airports use the same three-letter location identifier for the FAA and IATA, this airport is assigned USW by the FAA but has no designation from the IATA.

Facilities and aircraft 
Boggs Field covers an area of 177 acres (72 ha) at an elevation of 928 feet (283 m) above mean sea level. It has one runway designated 10/28 with an asphalt surface measuring 4,549 by 75 feet (1,387 x 23 m).

For the 12-month period ending December 31, 2009, the airport had 3,100 aircraft operations, an average of 258 per month: 97% general aviation and 3% military. At that time there were 10 aircraft based at this airport: 80% single-engine, 10% multi-engine, and 10% helicopter.

References

External links 
 
 

Airports in West Virginia
Transportation in Roane County, West Virginia